Ralph Elijah King, Sr. (June 16, 1902 – December 2, 1974), was a physician from Winnsboro, Louisiana, who served three non-consecutive terms in the Louisiana State Senate for Catahoula, Franklin, and Richland parishes from 1944 to 1952 and again from 1956 to 1960.

Ralf Jr. remarried to Isabel Bernal, a Colombian born aristocrat with ties to the Eisenhower family, in the early 80's. He adopted her two sons Martin Echavarria, award-winning author of "Enabling Collaboration - Achieving Success Through Strategic Alliances and Partnerships" and Camilo Echavarria, attorney at Davis Wright Tremaine. They divorced after three years of marriage.

References

1902 births
1974 deaths
People from Winnsboro, Louisiana
Physicians from Louisiana
Democratic Party Louisiana state senators
20th-century American politicians